The Pictet Collection is a private art collection established by the Pictet financial group since 2004. It is composed of paintings, photographs, drawings, sculptures, installations and videos made by artists born in or having a strong cultural link with Switzerland. In 2021, the collection had over 900 works of art.

Loa Haagen Pictet has been the curator of the Collection since 2015. She was also president of the International Association of Corporate Collections of Contemporary Art (IACCCA) from 2014 to 2022.

History 

Before the creation of its collection, the Pictet Group had a limited number of works of art in its offices, mainly dating from the nineteenth century. In 2004, the group began building up a full-fledged art collection, the initial aim of which was to decorate its new headquarters in the Acacias district in Geneva. The idea was to assemble a collection of works of art dating from the founding of the Pictet bank (1805) to the present day, visible on a daily basis to the bank's employees and clients.

The Pictet Collection is on display at the Group's headquarters in Geneva, as well as in its offices in Switzerland and abroad, including Lausanne, Zurich, London, Milan, Barcelona, Paris, Montreal, Hong Kong and Singapore. In 2018, the Collection also became available to the general public in digital form by being freely searchable on the collection's website. This digital referencing also simplifies the identification of works for cultural institutions wishing to make a loan request. The pieces are regularly loaned to museums in Switzerland and abroad.

The Collection is growing at a steady pace, and in a variety of fields: paintings, photographs, drawings, sculptures, but also in situ installations, architectural creations and video works. An important part of the Collection is dedicated to contemporary art. The first works acquired by the Pictet Group in 2004 were paintings from the twentieth century by Cuno Amiet. The collection had 600 works in 2016, 650 in 2017, 780 in 2018, 850 in 2020 and over 900 in 2021, two-thirds of which are the work of contemporary artists.

Artists 
Among the artists whose works are on display in the collection are:

 Jacques-Laurent Agasse
 Cuno Amiet
 John M. Armleder
Jean Arp
 Alice Bailly
 Max Bill
 Miriam Cahn
 Alexandre Calame
 François Diday
 
 Peter Fischli & David Weiss

 Sylvie Fleury
 Franz Gertsch
 Alberto Giacometti
 Giovanni Giacometti
 Thomas Hirschhorn
 Ferdinand Hodler
 Christian Marclay
 Olivier Mosset
 Meret Oppenheim
 Markus Raetz
 Pierre-Louis De la Rive

 Ugo Rondinone
 Niki de Saint Phalle
 Roman Signer
 Louis Soutter
 Daniel Spoerri
 Beat Streuli
 Jean Tinguely
 Niele Toroni
 Félix Valloton
 Rémy Zaugg

Awards 
In 2017, Global Corporate Collections ranked the Pictet Collection as one of the "100 best private corporate collections in the world".

See also
 Prix Pictet

References

External link 

Private collections in Switzerland